In the theory of partial differential equations,  elliptic operators are  differential operators that generalize the Laplace operator. They are defined by the condition that the coefficients of the highest-order derivatives be positive, which implies the key property that the principal symbol is invertible, or equivalently that there are no real characteristic directions.

Elliptic operators are typical of potential theory, and they appear frequently in electrostatics and continuum mechanics. Elliptic regularity implies that their solutions tend to be smooth functions (if the coefficients in the operator are smooth).  Steady-state solutions to hyperbolic and parabolic equations generally solve elliptic equations.

Definitions

Let  be a linear differential operator of order m on a domain  in Rn given by

where .

In many applications, this condition is not strong enough, and instead a uniform ellipticity condition may be imposed for operators of order m = 2k:

where C is a positive constant. Note that ellipticity only depends on the highest-order terms.

A nonlinear operator

is elliptic if its linearization is; i.e. the first-order Taylor expansion with respect to u and its derivatives about any point is an elliptic operator.

The Laplace operator occurs frequently in electrostatics. If ρ is the charge density within some region Ω, the potential Φ must satisfy the equation 
 Example 2 Given a matrix-valued function A(x) which is symmetric and positive definite for every x, having components aij, the operator  is elliptic. This is the most general form of a second-order divergence form linear elliptic differential operator. The Laplace operator is obtained by taking A = I. These operators also occur in electrostatics in polarized media.
 Example 3 For p a non-negative number, the p-Laplacian is a nonlinear elliptic operator defined by  A similar nonlinear operator occurs in glacier mechanics.

Elliptic regularity theorem

Let L be an elliptic operator of order 2k with coefficients having 2k continuous derivatives. The Dirichlet problem for L is to find a function u, given a function f and some appropriate boundary values, such that Lu = f and such that u has the appropriate boundary values and normal derivatives. The existence theory for elliptic operators, using Gårding's inequality and the Lax–Milgram lemma, only guarantees that a weak solution u exists in the Sobolev space Hk.

This situation is ultimately unsatisfactory, as the weak solution u might not have enough derivatives for the expression Lu to be well-defined in the classical sense.

The elliptic regularity theorem guarantees that, provided f is square-integrable, u will in fact have 2k square-integrable weak derivatives. In particular, if f is infinitely-often differentiable, then so is u.

Any differential operator exhibiting this property is called a hypoelliptic operator; thus, every elliptic operator is hypoelliptic. The property also means that every fundamental solution of an elliptic operator is infinitely differentiable in any neighborhood not containing 0.

As an application, suppose a function  satisfies the Cauchy–Riemann equations. Since the Cauchy-Riemann equations form an elliptic operator, it follows that  is smooth.

General definition

Let  be a (possibly nonlinear) differential operator between vector bundles of any rank.  Take its principal symbol  with respect to a one-form .  (Basically, what we are doing is replacing the highest order covariant derivatives  by vector fields .)

We say  is weakly elliptic if  is a linear isomorphism for every non-zero .

We say  is (uniformly) strongly elliptic if for some constant ,

for all  and all . It is important to note that the definition of ellipticity in the previous part of the article is strong ellipticity. Here  is an inner product.

The quintessential example of a (strongly) elliptic operator is the Laplacian (or its negative, depending upon convention).  It is not hard to see that  needs to be of even order for strong ellipticity to even be an option.  Otherwise, just consider plugging in both  and its negative.  On the other hand, a weakly elliptic first-order operator, such as the Dirac operator can square to become a strongly elliptic operator, such as the Laplacian.  The composition of weakly elliptic operators is weakly elliptic.

Weak ellipticity is nevertheless strong enough for the Fredholm alternative, Schauder estimates, and the Atiyah–Singer index theorem.  On the other hand, we need strong ellipticity for the maximum principle, and to guarantee that the eigenvalues are discrete, and their only limit point is infinity.

See also

 Elliptic partial differential equation
 Hyperbolic partial differential equation
 Parabolic partial differential equation
 Hopf maximum principle
 Elliptic complex
 Ultrahyperbolic wave equation
 Semi-elliptic operator
 Weyl's lemma

Notes

References

 Review:

External links
 Linear Elliptic Equations at EqWorld: The World of Mathematical Equations.
 Nonlinear Elliptic Equations at EqWorld: The World of Mathematical Equations.

Differential operators